New Edition ~Maximum Hits~ is MAX's third remix compilation. The album was released to celebrate the return of the original line-up of MAX and includes 12 brand new remixes of some of their biggest hits. The album was released in a standalone CD format as well as a CD and DVD package on December 10, 2008. The CD and DVD package contains 12 original music videos and a behind-the-scenes look at the photography for the album. A new song, "Are You Ready?" was included as a bonus track.

Track listing

CD - New mix

DVD - Original video clips

Charts
Album - Oricon Sales Chart (Japan)

MAX (band) albums
2008 remix albums
Avex Group remix albums